Frederick Wortendyke House is located in Park Ridge, Bergen County, New Jersey, United States. The house was built in 1750 and was added to the National Register of Historic Places on January 10, 1983.

See also
National Register of Historic Places listings in Bergen County, New Jersey

References

Houses on the National Register of Historic Places in New Jersey
Houses completed in 1750
Houses in Bergen County, New Jersey
National Register of Historic Places in Bergen County, New Jersey
Park Ridge, New Jersey
New Jersey Register of Historic Places